Southern Bloc may refer to:

Lao Development Association, a political party originally known as the Southern Bloc
Southern Bloc (South Sudan), a parliamentary faction in the Sudanese parliament formed by parties from southern Sudan
Southern Bloc of the FARC-EP, a bloc of FARC in Colombia
Solid South, the electoral voting bloc of the states of the Southern United States